Relative Chaos is a television film directed by Steven Robman and starring Christopher Gorham and Nicholas Brendon. It premiered on ABC Family in 2006.

Premise
At an annual family reunion, the youngest of three siblings attempts to win a family athletic competition called the Gilbert Cup and beat his siblings for the first time.

Cast
Christopher Gorham as Dil Gilbert   
Nicholas Brendon as Gil Gilbert 
Terry Bradshaw as Will Gilbert   
Charisma Carpenter as Katherine

External links
 

2006 television films
2006 films
ABC Family original films
Films directed by Steven Robman
2000s English-language films